The Women's 100m athletics events for the 2012 Summer Paralympics took place at the London Olympic Stadium from August 31 to September 8. A total of 14 events were contested over this distance for 14 different classifications.

Results

T11

Final

T12

Final

T13

Final

T34

Final

T35

There were no heats in this event. The final was competed on 7 September 2012 at 19:33.

Final

T36

Final

T37

Final

T38

Final

T42

There were no heats in this event. The final was competed on 5 September 2012 at 20:49.

Final

T44

Final

T46

The T46 category is for athletes who have a single above or below elbow amputation or similar disability, with normal function in both legs.

Final

T52

There were no heats in this event. The final was competed on 5 September 2012 at 21:24.

Final

T53

There were no heats in this event. The final was competed on 2 September 2012 at 20:58.

Final

T54

Final

References

Athletics at the 2012 Summer Paralympics
2012 in women's athletics
2012
Women's sport in London